Francesco Romoli (born 27 May 1977) is an Italian-born artist based in Tuscany. He combines photography with graphic design to create intriguing and surreal images, seeking to disconnect the photographic medium from reality.

Biography
Francesco Romoli studied computer science at the University of Pisa.

In his Solo Exhibition in Milan, at MIA fair, in April 2015 the artist presented for the first time his series of Photographs Dark City, made by miniature scenes and dioramas of a fictional city.

He is known internationally for his series Imaginary Towns, created in 2013, a series of photographs made by cardboard.

He currently lives and works in Pisa.

Awards and exhibitions

Romoli's works were selected for the Sony Photography Awards 2014, exhibited in London at Somerset House.

In April 2014 Romoli's gif 'Pandemonim:Death&Rebirth' was presented at Saatchi Gallery in occasion of the Saatchi Gallery and Google Plus Motion Photography Prize.

The works of Romoli have been presented in various art fairs as MIA fair in Milan, Photissima in Turin and Venice.

References

Living people
1977 births
Italian photographers